The Junkers EF 126 was an experimental fighter proposed by the German  of 1944–1945, for a cheap and simple fighter powered by a pulsejet engine. No examples were built during the war, but the Soviet Union completed both unpowered and powered prototypes.

The design of the Ju EF 126 was developed into the Junkers EF 127, a rocket-powered version.

In order to minimise cost and complexity, it was to be powered by a pulse jet, as used by the V-1 flying bomb and its manned version, the Fieseler Fi 103R (Reichenberg). Designs were produced by Heinkel, with a pulse jet powered version of their Heinkel He 162, Blohm & Voss (the P213) and Junkers.

Ef 126
The fuselage was of metal construction while the wings were wooden. A retractable nosewheel undercarriage was to be fitted. As the pulse-jet's power would reduce at altitude, the aircraft was intended for low-altitude use, and had a secondary ground attack role.

Variants
EF 126 V1
First prototype, towed into the air by a captured Junkers Ju 88G-6 in the post war period. Later, it crashed.

EF 126 V2
Second prototype, also constructed but never completed.

EF 126 V3,V5
Complete prototypes with Argus pulse jet.

EF 126 V4
Completed and tested by the Soviets in 1947, with a running engine.

Specifications (Ju EF 126)

See also

References

External links

 Junkers EF 126 Image
 German aircraft projects (in German)

EF 126
World War II fighter aircraft of Germany
Pulsejet-powered aircraft
Single-engined jet aircraft